Tephritis poenia is a species of tephritid or fruit flies in the genus Tephritis of the family Tephritidae.

Distribution
New Guinea, Australia.

References

Tephritinae
Insects described in 1849
Diptera of Australasia